Congratulations may refer to:

Film and television 
 Congratulations (2010 film), an Egyptian film
 Congratulations (2023 film), a Gujarati drama film
Congratulations: 50 Years of the Eurovision Song Contest, 2005 television programme to commemorate its fiftieth anniversary

Music

Albums 
 Congratulations (album), an album by MGMT
 Congratulations, an album by BZN
 Congratulations, an album by Amy Hart
 Congratulations, an album by Mac Lethal
 Congratulations… I'm Sorry, an album by Gin Blossoms

Songs 
"Congratulate" (song), by AKA, 2014
 "Congratulations" (Cliff Richard song), 1968
 "Congratulations" (MGMT song), 2010
 "Congratulations" (Roomie, PewDiePie and Boyinaband song), 2019
 "Congratulations" (Post Malone song), 2016
 "Congratulations" (Silvía Night song), 2006
 "Congratulations" (Vesta song), 1989
 "Congratulations", by Blue October from Foiled, 2006
 "Congratulations", by Faron Young from Hello Walls, 1961
 "Congratulations", by Juliana Hatfield from Only Everything, 1995
 "Congratulations", by Mac Miller from The Divine Feminine, 2016
 "Congratulations", by Ne-Yo from Non-Fiction, 2015
 "Congratulations", by Paul Simon from Paul Simon, 1972
 "Congratulations", by Rachel Platten from Wildfire, 2016
 "Congratulations", by The Rolling Stones from 12 X 5, 1964
 "Congratulations", by Simple Plan Harder Than It Looks, 2022
 "Congratulations", by Sleeping with Sirens from Feel, 2013
 "Congratulations", by Traveling Wilburys from Traveling Wilburys Vol. 1, 1988
 "Congratulations" (Chinese song), or "Wishing You Happiness and Prosperity", a popular Mandarin Chinese song and a Chinese Lunar New Year standard